Pressure-correction method is a class of methods used in computational fluid dynamics for numerically solving the Navier-Stokes equations normally for incompressible flows.

Common properties 
The equations solved in this approach arise from the implicit time integration of the incompressible Navier–Stokes equations.

Due to the non-linearity of the convective term in the momentum equation that is written above, this problem is solved with a nested-loop approach. While so called global
The outer iterations comprise two steps:

 Solve the momentum equation for a provisional velocity based on the velocity and pressure of the previous outer loop.
 Plug the new newly obtained velocity into the continuity equation to obtain a correction.

The correction for the velocity that is obtained from the second equation one has with incompressible flow, the non-divergence criterion or continuity equation

 

is computed by first calculating a residual value , resulting from spurious mass flux, then using this mass imbalance to get a new pressure value. The pressure value that is attempted to compute, is such that when plugged into momentum equations a divergence-free velocity field results. The mass imbalance is often also used for control of the outer loop.
The name of this class of methods stems from the fact that the correction of the velocity field is computed through the pressure-field.

The discretization of this is typically done with either the finite element method or the finite volume method. With the latter, one might also encounter the dual mesh, i.e. the computation grid obtained from connecting the centers of the cells that the initial subdivision into finite elements of the computation domain yielded.

Implicit split-update procedures 
Another approach which is typically used in FEM is the following.

The aim of the correction step is to ensure conservation of mass. In continuous form for compressible substances mass, conservation of mass is expressed by

 

where  is the square of the "speed of sound". For low Mach numbers and incompressible media  is assumed to be infinite, which is the reason for the above continuity equation to reduce to

 

The way of obtaining a velocity field satisfying the above, is to compute a pressure which when substituted into the momentum equation leads to the desired correction of a preliminary computed intermediate velocity.

Applying the divergence operator to the compressible momentum equation yields

 

 then provides the governing equation for pressure computation.

The idea of pressure-correction also exists in the case of variable density and high Mach numbers, although in this case there is a real physical meaning behind the coupling of dynamic pressure and velocity as arising from the continuity equation

 

 is with compressibility, still an additional variable that can be eliminated with algebraic operations, but its variability is not a pure artifice as in the compressible case, and the methods for its computation differ significantly from those with

References 

 M. Thomadakis, M. Leschziner: A PRESSURE-CORRECTION METHOD FOR THE SOLUTION OF INCOMPRESSIBLE VISCOUS FLOWS ON UNSTRUCTURED GRIDS, Int. Journal for Numerical Meth. in Fluids, Vol. 22, 1996
 A. Meister, J. Struckmeier: Hyperbolic Partial Differential Equations, 1st Edition, Vieweg, 2002

External links 
 ISNaS – incompressible flow solver
 Application of Temperature and/or Pressure Correction Factors in Gas Measurement

Fluid dynamics
Computational fluid dynamics